Paudie is a given name. Notable people with the name include:

Paudie Butler (born 1950), Irish retired hurler and Gaelic footballer
Paudie Coffey (born 1969), Irish Fine Gael politician who has served as a Senator since May 2016
Paudie Fitzgerald (1933–2020), Irish cyclist
Paudie Fitzmaurice (born 1949), successful hurler from Killeedy in County Limerick, Ireland
Paudie Kehoe (born 1990), Irish hurler who plays as a left corner-forward
Paudie Kissane (born 1980), Irish Gaelic footballer
Paudie Lannon (born 1956), Irish retired hurler who played as a midfielder
Paudie Lynch (born 1952), former Irish Gaelic footballer
Paudie Mulhaire (born 1976), Irish sportsperson
Paudie O'Brien (born 1989), Irish hurler who currently plays as a midfielder
Paudie O'Donoghue (1944–2008), Irish sportsperson
Paudie O'Dwyer (born 1982), Irish hurler who currently played as a right wing-back
Paudie O'Mahony (born 1952), Irish retired Gaelic footballer
Paudie O'Neill (born 1957), Irish retired hurler and Gaelic footballer
Paudie O'Se or Páidí Ó Sé (1955–2012), Irish Gaelic football manager and player
Paudie Ireland (born 1987), Irish Gaelic Football player
Paudie O'Sullivan (born 1988), Irish hurler who plays as a Full Forward
Paudie Prendergast (born 1960), retired Irish hurler
Paudie Sheehy (1932–1967), Irish sportsperson

See also
Padi (disambiguation)
Phaudidae